Melodica is the debut EP by American hip hop duo Blackalicious. It was originally released on Solesides in 1994. It was reissued digitally in 2012 with an additional bonus track "Change".

Critical reception

Lee Meyer of AllMusic gave the EP 3 stars out of 5, calling it "an admirable effort that gives a glimpse of the group's potential." Nate Patrin of Pitchfork gave the EP a 7.5 out of 10, saying: "This is conscious-minded, lyrically technical underground hip-hop at its rawest and, sometimes, at its most over-the-top ridiculous."

In 2015, Fact placed it at number 69 on the "100 Best Indie Hip-Hop Records of All Time" list.

Track listing

References

External links
 
 

1994 debut EPs
Blackalicious albums
Mo' Wax EPs
Quannum Projects EPs